The ninth season of the American competitive reality television series MasterChef premiered on Fox on May 30, 2018, and concluded on September 19, 2018. Gordon Ramsay and Aarón Sánchez returned as from the previous season as judges, while former judge Joe Bastianich returned to the show as the third judge, replacing Christina Tosi. The season was won by English teacher Gerron Hurt, with professional grocery shopper Ashley Mincey and high school teacher Cesar Cano as co-runners-up.

This season introduced a new format to the show, as the three judges each selected eight contestants to give aprons to, and then the judges mentor their respective contestants throughout the competition.

Top 24
Except where noted, source for all names, hometowns, and occupations: All ages and nicknames as given on air.

Elimination table

 (WINNER) This cook won the competition.
 (RUNNER-UP) This cook finished as a runner-up in the finals.
 (WIN) The cook won the individual challenge (Mystery Box Challenge/ Skills Test or Elimination Test).
 (WIN) The cook was on the winning team in the Team Challenge and directly advanced to the next round.
 (HIGH) The cook was one of the top entries in the individual challenge but didn't win.
 (IN) The cook wasn't selected as a top or bottom entry in an individual challenge.
 (IN) The cook wasn't selected as a top or bottom entry in a team challenge.
 (IMM) The cook didn't have to compete in that round of the competition and was safe from elimination.
 (IMM) The cook was selected by Mystery Box Challenge winner and didn't have to compete in the Elimination Test.
 (PT) The cook was on the losing team in the Team Challenge, competed in the Pressure Test, and advanced.
 (NPT) The cook was on the losing team in the Team Challenge, did not compete in the Pressure Test, and advanced.
 (LOW) The cook was one of the bottom entries in an individual challenge or Pressure Test, and they advanced.
 (LOW) The cook was one of the bottom entries in the Team Challenge and they advanced.
 (ELIM) The cook was eliminated from MasterChef.

Episodes

References

2018 American television seasons
MasterChef (American TV series)